Tectonatica pusilla is a species of predatory sea snail, a marine gastropod mollusk in the family Naticidae, the moon snails.

Description 
The maximum recorded shell length is 8 mm.

Habitat 
Minimum recorded depth is 0 m. Maximum recorded depth is 130 m.

References

Naticidae
Gastropods described in 1822